is a Japanese anime series by Nippon Animation, and part of the World Masterpiece Theater series. It consists of 51 episodes. Premiering across Fuji TV from 12 January to 28 December 1986, it has rerun across Japan on Animax from February 2007. It was dubbed in other languages for some regions of the world outside Japan including Portugal, France, Italy, Spain, Germany, Ukraine, Arab World, and Philippines.

It was based on the 1913 novel Pollyanna and following 1915 sequel Pollyanna Grows Up by Eleanor H. Porter.

Premise 
The story follows Pollyanna, a young orphan girl whose parents passed away when she was younger. The series begins when Pollyanna is sent to the town of Beldingsville to live with her Aunt Polly Harrington, one of her few remaining relatives.

Characters
 Narrator : Taeko Nakanishi

Whittier and Harrington families

The main character. The 8 year old daughter of Pastor John and Jennie Whittier, and niece of Polly Harrington. She lost her mother when she was 4 years old, and lost her father and became an orphan when she was 8 years old.
 Her principle is "seeking a good", and she often says that "I'm fond of (something)".

Pollyanna's father. A pastor who taught his daughter Pollyanna to "seeking a good". When Polyanna was eight years old, he died of illness at the age of 38.

Pollyanna's mother.

Pollyanna's aunt, Jennie's younger sister. She is cold and drove Pollyanna into the attic.

Harrington family's allies

A maid of Harrington family.

Small Midwestern town

Beldingsville, Vermont

A Pollyanna's friend, an orphan boy. After a while, it was taken over by John Pendleton.

Boston, Massachusetts

The Wetherbys

Wetherby family's allies

Staff
 Director : Kōzō Kusuba
 Character design : Yoshiharu Satō
 Music : Reijirō Koroku
 Sound director : Etsuji Yamada
 Art director : Ken Kawai
 Planning : Shōji Satō (Nippon Animation), Eiichi Kubota (Fuji TV)
 Producer : Junzō Nakajima (Nippon Animation), Taihei Ishikawa (Fuji TV)
 Production manager : Mitsuru Takakuwa

Episodes

Theme songs
 Opening theme
  (eps 01–27)
 Singer : Yūki Kudō
 Lyricist : Yūho Iwasato
 Composer : Hiroaki Serizawa
 Arranger : Kazuya Izumi
  (eps 28–51)
 Singer : Yūki Kudō
 Lyricist : Jun Asami
 Composer : Kisaburō Suzuki
 Arranger : Tatsumi Yano

 Ending theme
  (eps 01–27)
 Singer : Yūki Kudō
 Lyricist : Yūho Iwasato
 Composer : Hiroaki Serizawa
 Arranger : Kazuya Izumi
  (eps 28–51)
 Singer : Yūki Kudō
 Lyricist : Noriko Miura
 Composer : Yasuo Kosugi
 Arranger : Tatsumi Yano

 Insertion song
  (ep 27)
 Singer : Mitsuko Horie
 Lyricist, composer and arranger : Akiko Kosaka  
  (ep 51)
 Singer : Mitsuko Horie
 Lyricist, composer and arranger : Akiko Kosaka

 Notes
Yūki Kudō has appeared in both the main story and theme songs, and acts Karen in the main story.

Discourse of casts 
 Yūki Kudō : At the mini-live on 1 November 2014.
 "I like the theme song of «Pollyanna» which I sang, and Pollyanna's principle of «finding fun even if in pain»."

 Mitsuko Horie : 
 "Most favorite character is Pollyanna."

References

External links 
Ai Shōjo Pollyanna Monogatari on Animax's official site

See also
 Pollyanna principle
 My Daddy Long Legs
 Jeanie with the Light Brown Hair (TV series)
 These two works are starring Mitsuko Horie and produced by Nippon Animation.
 Pollyanna principle

1986 anime television series debuts
1986 Japanese television series debuts
1986 Japanese television series endings
Television series set in the 1920s
Television shows set in Vermont
Television shows set in Boston
Drama anime and manga
Historical anime and manga
Fictional chipmunks
Animated television series about orphans
World Masterpiece Theater series
Fuji TV original programming
Television shows based on American novels